.la is the Internet country code top-level domain (ccTLD) for Laos.

Although the .la domain is officially assigned to the country of Laos, subdomains have been delegated to some organizations outside Laos.

History
The LA Names Corporation, based in Guernsey, has gained the rights to market .la registrations, and they had used the registry services of Afilias and, formerly, the registrar services of DreamHost. However, DreamHost has discontinued registrar services . LA Names and CentralNic, Ltd. completed the transfer of the .la domain name to the CentralNic system in 2007. Cabel Sasser of Panic created "Poopla" (xn--ls8h.la), "The World's First Emoji Domain" on April 13, 2011. A company based in of Hong Kong by the name of Sterling Holdings originally purchased the TLD from Laos, and marketed it towards users in Louisiana and LA.

Popular use

The domain is used by organizations in the state of Louisiana (whose postal abbreviation is LA) and the city of Los Angeles. No official or unofficial association exists between the .la domain and any government in the United States (see .gov and .org). It also sees limited use for businesses in Latin America, such as Intel's site for the region.

The .la domain is also used for domain hacks in the French language and the Chinese language.  means "there" in French and in Italian, and in other Romance languages; "" is a common modal word at the end of a sentence or a phrase in Mandarin Chinese and Cantonese.

Mozilla Foundation's URL shortener uses it with the "mzl.la" domain hack.

Tesla Motors uses "ts.la" domain hack as a shortener and a redirect.

Digikala, an e-commerce startup in Iran and the Middle East uses the "dgka.la" domain hack as a shortener.

The Network information center of .la is oriented to pages based in Los Angeles.

The Digital Public Library of America uses dp.la.

Lao language domain
In 2008 a preliminary application was made to open the internationalized top level domain  (the name of Laos in the Lao language). In 2019 this top level domain was approved. Web sites will come at a later stage. It is intended for usage with domain names in Lao script.

References

External links
 IANA .la whois information

Communications in Laos
Country code top-level domains

sv:Toppdomän#L